Late Night Tales: Four Tet is a DJ mix album compiled by Kieran Hebden, who goes by the pseudonym Four Tet. It is part of the Late Night Tales/Another Late Night compilation series.

Track listing
 "Haunted Feelings" – 2:21 – Rahsaan Roland Kirk
 "Battle Rhymes For Battle Times" – 2:37 – Koushik
 "Wiggy" (Edit) – 0:32 – Hal Blaine
 "One Way Glass" – 3:37 – Manfred Mann Chapter Three
 "Music For The Gift" (part 2) – 1:52 – Terry Riley
 "January V" – 3:18 – Max Roach
 "Why We Fight" – 4:08 – Tortoise
 "2 Cups Of Blood" – 1:24 – Gravediggaz
 "Earth" – 13:16 – Joe Henderson
 "Parallelograms" – 4:31 – Linda Perhacs
 "Castles Made of Sand" – 3:35 – Four Tet
 "Valiha Del" – 4:47 – Jef Gilson + Malagasy
 "Strange Ways" (Koushik's Remix) – 2:13 – Madvillain
 "Griffo" (Edit) – 0:49 – Smoke
 "Tale In Hard Time" – 3:27 – Fairport Convention
 "Tinkle" – 0:36 – J Saunders
 "Benevolent Incubator" – 10:11 – Icarus
 "218 Beverley" – 7:27 – Manitoba
 "Don'ts" – 3:31 – David Shrigley

Four Tet
2004 compilation albums